"Breaking New Ground" is a song written by Carl Jackson and Jerry Salley, and recorded by American country music group Wild Rose. It was released in August 1989 as the first single and title track from their debut album Breaking New Ground. The song peaked at number 15 on the Billboard Hot Country Singles chart and reached number 42 on the RPM Country Tracks chart in Canada.

Chart performance

References

1989 debut singles
1989 songs
Wild Rose (band) songs
Songs written by Jerry Salley
Song recordings produced by James Stroud
Capitol Records singles
Universal Records (1988) singles